"Tryin' to Love Two" was a hit song by R&B singer William Bell in 1977.  Released from his album, Coming Back for More, it would become his biggest hit, reaching number one on the R&B charts and crossing over to the pop charts, reaching number ten on the Billboard Hot 100. It would eventually sell over a million singles.  The single was written and produced by William Bell and Paul Mitchell and was the first song recorded by Bell after a three-year hiatus from recording.

References

1977 singles
1977 songs
Songs written by William Bell (singer)